In mathematics, a cobordism (W, M, M−) of an (n + 1)-dimensional manifold (with boundary) W between its boundary components, two n-manifolds M and M−, is called a semi-s-cobordism if (and only if) the inclusion  is a simple homotopy equivalence (as in an s-cobordism), with no further requirement on the inclusion  (not even being a homotopy equivalence).

Other notations
The original creator of this topic, Jean-Claude Hausmann, used the notation M− for the right-hand boundary of the cobordism.

Properties
A consequence of (W, M, M−) being a semi-s-cobordism is that the kernel of the derived homomorphism on fundamental groups  is perfect. A corollary of this is that  solves the group extension problem . The solutions to the group extension problem for prescribed quotient group  and kernel group K are classified up to congruence by group cohomology (see Mac Lane's Homology pp. 124-129), so there are restrictions on which n-manifolds can be the right-hand boundary of a semi-s-cobordism with prescribed left-hand boundary M and superperfect kernel group K.

Relationship with Plus cobordisms
Note that if (W, M, M−) is a semi-s-cobordism, then (W, M−, M) is a plus cobordism. (This justifies the use of M− for the right-hand boundary of a semi-s-cobordism, a play on the traditional use of M+ for the right-hand boundary of a plus cobordism.) Thus, a semi-s-cobordism may be thought of as an inverse to Quillen's Plus construction in the manifold category. Note that (M−)+ must be diffeomorphic (respectively, piecewise-linearly (PL) homeomorphic) to M but there may be a variety of choices for (M+)− for a given closed smooth (respectively, PL) manifold M.

References

.
.
.

Manifolds
Geometric topology
Algebraic topology
Homotopy theory